Kittredge is both a surname and a given name. Notable people with the name include:

Surname:
 Abbott Eliot Kittredge (1834–1912), American leader of the Presbyterian Church
 Alfred B. Kittredge (1861–1911), United States Senator from South Dakota
 Andrew Kittredge (born 1990), American baseball pitcher
 Beau Kittredge (born 1982), American ultimate Frisbee player
 Caitlin Kittredge (born 1984), American author and comic-book writer
 David Kittredge (born 1972), American film director, editor and screenwriter
 Elsie May Kittredge (1870–1954), American botanist
 George Lyman Kittredge (1860–1941), American professor of English literature
 George W. Kittredge (1805–1881), United States Representative from New Hampshire
 John W. Kittredge (born 1956), American lawyer and justice of the South Carolina Supreme Court
 Mabel Hyde Kittredge (1867–1955), American home economist and social worker
 Walter Kittredge (1834–1905), American musician, most notably during and about the American Civil War
 William Kittredge (1932–2020), American writer
 William A. Kittredge (1891–1945), American designer and author on design
 William C. Kittredge (1800–1869), American lawyer and politician in Vermont

Given name:
 Kittredge Cherry (born 1957), American writer
 Kittredge Haskins (1836–1916), United States Representative from Vermont

Middle name:
 Millicent Kittredge Blake (1822–1907), American educator in California
 Francis K. Shattuck (1824–1898), American civic leader in California
 Charles Kittredge True (1809–1878), American Methodist Episcopal clergyman, educator, and author
 Arthur K. Watson (1919–1974), American businessman and diplomat

Fictional characters:
 Kit Kittredge, a character from the American Girl franchise

See also
 Kittridge